The Sedona Red Rock News is a newspaper published in Sedona, Arizona. It is Sedona's only general interest print newspaper. The Sedona Red Rock News is the flagship newspaper of the family-owned Larson Newspapers, which also owns The Camp Verde Journal and the Cottonwood Journal Extra. General Manager Kyle Larson, grandson of founders Robert S. Larson and Loretta Larson, has run day-to-day operations since September 2015.

The Sedona Red Rock News began in 1963 as the Red Rock News. The name changed to Sedona Red Rock News in January 1982. Managing Editor Christopher Fox Graham was promoted from News Editor in August 2013.

The paper is distributed twice a week, Tuesday afternoon or evening for the Wednesday edition, and Thursday afternoon or evening for the Friday edition.

References

External links
 Official web site

Sedona Red Rock News
Sedona Red Rock News
Sedona Red Rock News
Newspapers established in 1963
1963 establishments in Arizona
Sedona, Arizona